Anne Lockhart of Tarbrax was the daughter of Sir James Lockhart of Lee.

She was married to George Lockhart of Tarbrax.

She had a son William Lockhart of Tarbrax and a daughter Anne, who became Countess of Aberdeen.

Lockhart, Anne
Lockhart, Anne
Nobility of the United Kingdom
17th-century Scottish people